Girondins de Bordeaux won Division 1 season 1984/1985 of the French Association Football League with 59 points.

Participating teams

Auxerre
SEC Bastia
Bordeaux
Stade Brest
Stade Lavallois
RC Lens
Lille
Olympique Marseille
FC Metz
AS Monaco
AS Nancy
FC Nantes Atlantique
RC Paris
Paris Saint-Germain FC
FC Rouen
FC Sochaux
RC Strasbourg
Sporting Toulon Var
Toulouse FC
Tours FC

League table

Promoted from Division 2, who will play in Division 1 season 1985/1986
 Le Havre AC:Champion of Division 2, winner of Division 2 group A
 OGC Nice:Runner-up, winner of Division 2 group B
 Stade Rennais:Third place, winner of barrages against FC Rouen

Results

Relegation play-offs

|}

Top goalscorers

References

 Division 1 season 1984-1985 at pari-et-gagne.com

Ligue 1 seasons
France
1